Deh Now is a village in Rivand Rural District, in the Central District of Nishapur County, Razavi Khorasan Province, Iran. At the 2006 census, its population was 130, in 36 families.

References 

Populated places in Nishapur County